Abdulkadir Ubeydullah (1851, Şemdinli - 1925 Diyarbakır) was a President of the Kurdish Society for Cooperation and Progress (KTTC) and later the Society for the Rise of Kurdistan. He was a leading Kurdish intellectual and a once also a member of the Senate of the Ottoman Empire. He also took part in the uprising of Sheik Ubeydullah led by his father and was accused of having taken part in the Sheikh Said rebellion.

Early life 
The son of the notable Kurdish leader Sheikh Ubeydullah and grandson of Sheikh Taha. He was educated in the Naqshbandi tradition and his family claimed descent from Abdul Qadir Gilani. He was fluent in Kurdish, Turkish, Persian, Arabic and French. During the uprising of Sheik Ubeydullah, he was the commander of a contingent of Kurdish forces, which from October 1880 onwards on, captured several towns from the shores of Lake Urmia to the outskirts of Tabriz.

Exile 
He was exiled in 1881 after his father's unsuccessful rebellion against the Ottoman state. For some time there is little known about Abdulkadir, but in 1895 he is mentioned a member of the Committee for Union and Progress (CUP) in Constantinople. But then he was implicated in a plot to overthrow Sultan Abdul Hamid II, following which he was sent into exile to Mecca in 1896. From Mecca he traveled on the Beirut, but stayed in contact with politicians of the CUP. Enver Pasha asked for his collaboration in compelling the Kurdish tribes into acknowledging CUPs authority after the revolution of the Young Turks in 1908. It was a demand to which he agreed to.

Return to Ottoman capital 
He was a member of the Senate of the Ottoman Empire from 1910 to 1920 and then briefly President of the Ottoman Council of State. With the membership in the parliament his career in the Ottoman bureaucracy began, and after the World War I he presided over the sub-committee in the parliament.

Kurdish activities 
Following he returned from exile to Constantinople in 1908 and became one of the founders of the KTTC and later the SAK. In 1918 Abdulkadir became president of the SAK even though Emin Ali Bedir Khan from the influential Kurdish Bedir Khan family opposed him. As such, he lobbied for an autonomous Kurdish region before the diplomats of France, Great Britain and the USA in Constantinople. The Peace Conference in Paris was discussed in the conversations. But he opposed that foreign powers were engaged in the creation of a future state in the aftermath of the defeat of the Ottoman Empire. In an interview given to the newspaper Ikdam in February 1920 Abdulkadir declared he was an adherent of an autonomous Kurdish region with a leadership elected by Kurds. He was also supportive of the achievements of Şerif Pasha (who supported an autonomous Kurdistan) at the Peace Conference in Paris. Nevertheless, the Grand vizier Damat Ferid Pasha suspected Abdul-Kadir was organizing Kurdish tribal leaders in Anatolia in preparation for independence. As his objection against a Kurdish independence was made public, the dispute between two leaders of the SAK, namely Abdulkadir and Emin Ali Bedir Khan who favored independence emerged and the SAK was dissolved. According to Robert Olson, the British intelligence reported that by 1924 Ubeydullah was the registered as the head of the Azadî office in Constantinople. He wielded great influence over the Kurdish population of Constantinople, and was described as an indispensable figure in Kurdish politics.

Death 
Abdulkadir and one of his son's Mehmed were charged of being involved in the Sheikh Said Rebellion and tried by the Independence Tribunal in Diyarbakir. He was sentenced to death together with his son on the 23 May 1925 and hanged two days later. His son Mehmed while walking towards the gallows opposite the Diyarbakir mosque was heard warning his executers that their governments actions would open a Pandora's box and bring calamity upon themselves. After their execution another of his son's named Abdullah rebelled against the government in revenge and according to British sources was temporarily successful.

References

1851 births
1925 deaths
Kurdish politicians
Prisoners and detainees of Turkey